Highway 745 is a highway in the Canadian province of Saskatchewan. It runs from Highway 35 near Elfros to Highway 310.

Highway 745 passes near the community of Kristnes.

See also 
Roads in Saskatchewan
Transportation in Saskatchewan

References 

745